Patrick Kenny may refer to:

 Pat Kenny (born 1948), Irish broadcaster
 Patrick Kenny (boxer) (born 1934), Irish Olympic boxer
 Patrick W. Kenny (died 1931), Irish politician
 Paddy Kenny (born 1978), football goalkeeper for Leeds United